Boetius Egan may refer to:

 Boetius Egan (archbishop of Tuam) (1734–1798), Irish Roman Catholic prelate
 Boetius Egan (bishop of Elphin) (died 1650), Irish Roman Catholic prelate

See also
 Boetius MacEgan (died 1650), Roman Catholic bishop of Ross, Ireland